Clavulinopsis sulcata is a clavarioid fungus in the family Clavariaceae and is the type species of the genus Clavulinopsis. It forms very long, slender, cylindrical pinkish or orange fruiting bodies that grow on the ground among plant litter.

Taxonomy
That fungus was originally described by the English cryptogamist Miles Joseph Berkeley in 1843 as Clavaria miniata, from collections made in Uitenhage, South Africa. Dutch mycologist Casper van Overeem gave it the name by which it is now known in 1923, when he made it the type species of the newly circumscribed genus Clavulinopsis. It forms part of a species complex.

Description
Several fruit bodies may grow close together, or they may grow singly, or in groups of two or three. At first they are tapering, but become irregularly fleshy or inflated later, and ridged or wrinkled and somewhat waxy as they age. The flesh is pink or orange-pink; the stipe is a similar colour but is pale pinkish-salmon at the base. The flesh is odourless and tastes mildly of carrots, with a slightly bitter aftertaste. The spores are borne on the sides of the clubs and have thin walls; they measure 5.8–7.2 by 5.8–6.8 µm, and are globose and opalescent.

Distribution and habitat
Clavulinopsis sulcata has a widespread distribution. It was first described (as Clavaria miniata) from South Africa, and is also present in North America, and Asia. In Australasia, it is found in eastern Australia and New Zealand, where its range includes the states of Queensland, New South Wales, Victoria and Tasmania, as well as both islands of New Zealand. It is a fairly common fungus, and its conservation status has been assessed as being of least concern. It grows on the ground among leaf litter. In Tasmania it is found in mixed Nothofagus and Leptospermum woodland.

References

Clavariaceae
Fungi described in 1923
Fungi of Africa
Fungi of Australia
Fungi of New Zealand
Fungi of North America